Sewage treatment (or domestic wastewater treatment, municipal wastewater treatment) is a type of wastewater treatment which aims to remove contaminants from sewage to produce an effluent that is suitable to discharge to the surrounding environment or an intended reuse application, thereby preventing water pollution from raw sewage discharges. Sewage contains wastewater from households and businesses and possibly pre-treated industrial wastewater. There are a high number of sewage treatment processes to choose from. These can range from decentralized systems (including on-site treatment systems) to large centralized systems involving a network of pipes and pump stations (called sewerage) which convey the sewage to a treatment plant. For cities that have a combined sewer, the sewers will also carry urban runoff (stormwater) to the sewage treatment plant. Sewage treatment often involves two main stages, called primary and secondary treatment, while advanced treatment also incorporates a tertiary treatment stage with polishing processes and nutrient removal. Secondary treatment can reduce organic matter (measured as biological oxygen demand) from sewage,  using aerobic or anaerobic biological processes.

A large number of sewage treatment technologies have been developed, mostly using biological treatment processes. Design engineers and decision makers need to take into account technical and economical criteria of each alternative when choosing a suitable technology. Often, the main criteria for selection are: desired effluent quality, expected construction and operating costs, availability of land, energy requirements and sustainability aspects. In developing countries and in rural areas with low population densities, sewage is often treated by various on-site sanitation systems and not conveyed in sewers. These systems include septic tanks connected to drain fields, on-site sewage systems (OSS), vermifilter systems and many more. On the other hand, advanced and relatively expensive sewage treatment plants in cities that can afford them may include tertiary treatment with disinfection and possibly even a fourth treatment stage to remove micropollutants.

At the global level, an estimated 52% of sewage is treated. However, sewage treatment rates are highly unequal for different countries around the world. For example, while high-income countries treat approximately 74% of their sewage, developing countries treat an average of just 4.2%. 

The treatment of sewage is part of the field of sanitation. Sanitation also includes the management of human waste and solid waste as well as stormwater (drainage) management. The term sewage treatment plant is often used interchangeably with the term wastewater treatment plant.

Terminology

The term sewage treatment plant (STP) (or sewage treatment works) is nowadays often replaced with the term wastewater treatment plant (WWTP). Strictly speaking, the latter is a broader term that can also refer to industrial wastewater treatment. 

The terms water recycling center or water reclamation plants are also in use as synonyms.

Purposes and overview 
The overall aim of treating sewage is to produce an effluent that can be discharged to the environment while causing as little water pollution as possible, or to produce an effluent that can be reused in a useful manner. This is achieved by removing contaminants from the sewage. It is a form of waste management. 

With regards to biological treatment of sewage, the treatment objectives can include various degrees of the following: to transform or remove organic matter, nutrients (nitrogen and phosphorus), pathogenic organisms, and specific trace organic constituents (micropollutants). 

Some types of sewage treatment produce sewage sludge which can be treated before safe disposal or reuse. Under certain circumstances, the treated sewage sludge might be termed biosolids and can be used as a fertilizer.

Sewage characteristics

Collection

Types of treatment processes 

Sewage can be treated close to where the sewage is created, which may be called a decentralized system or even an on-site system (on-site sewage facility, septic tanks, etc.). Alternatively, sewage can be collected and transported by a network of pipes and pump stations to a municipal treatment plant. This is called a centralized system (see also sewerage and pipes and infrastructure).

A large number of sewage treatment technologies have been developed, mostly using biological treatment processes (see list of wastewater treatment technologies). Very broadly, they can be grouped into high tech (high cost) versus low tech (low cost) options, although some technologies might fall into either category. Other grouping classifications are intensive or mechanized systems (more compact, and frequently employing high tech options) versus extensive or natural or nature-based systems (usually using natural treatment processes and occupying larger areas) systems. This classification may be sometimes oversimplified, because a treatment plant may involve a combination of processes, and the interpretation of the concepts of high tech and low tech, intensive and extensive, mechanized and natural processes may vary from place to place.

Low tech, extensive or nature-based processes 

Examples for more low-tech, often less expensive sewage treatment systems are shown below. They often use little or no energy. Some of these systems do not provide a high level of treatment, or only treat part of the sewage (for example only the toilet wastewater), or they only provide pre-treatment, like septic tanks. On the other hand, some systems are capable of providing a good performance, satisfactory for several applications. Many of these systems are based on natural treatment processes, requiring large areas, while others are more compact. In most cases, they are used in rural areas or in small to medium-sized communities. For example, waste stabilization ponds are a low cost treatment option with practically no energy requirements but they require a lot of land. Due to their technical simplicity, most of the savings (compared with high tech systems) are in terms of operation and maintenance costs. 

 Anaerobic digester types and anaerobic digestion, for example:
 Upflow anaerobic sludge blanket reactor
 Septic tank
 Imhoff tank
 Constructed wetland (see also biofilters)
 Decentralized wastewater system
 Nature-based solutions
 On-site sewage facility
 Sand filter
 Vermifilter
 Waste stabilization pond with sub-types: 
 e.g. Facultative ponds, high rate ponds, maturation ponds

Examples for systems that can provide full or partial treatment for toilet wastewater only:
 Composting toilet (see also dry toilets in general)
 Urine-diverting dry toilet 
 Vermifilter toilet

High tech, intensive or mechanized processes 

Examples for more high-tech, intensive or mechanized, often relatively expensive sewage treatment systems are listed below. Some of them are energy intensive as well. Many of them provide a very high level of treatment. For example, broadly speaking, the activated sludge process achieves a high effluent quality but is relatively expensive and energy intensive. 

 Activated sludge systems
 Aerobic treatment system
 Enhanced biological phosphorus removal
 Expanded granular sludge bed digestion
 Filtration
 Membrane bioreactor
 Moving bed biofilm reactor
 Rotating biological contactor
 Trickling filter
 Ultraviolet disinfection

Disposal or treatment options 
There are other process options which may be classified as disposal options, although they can also be understood as basic treatment options. These include: Application of sludge, irrigation, soak pit, leach field, fish pond, floating plant pond, water disposal/groundwater recharge, surface disposal and storage. 

The application of sewage to land is both: a type of treatment and a type of final disposal. It leads to groundwater recharge and/or to evapotranspiration. Land application include slow-rate systems, rapid infiltration, subsurface infiltration, overland flow. It is done by flooding, furrows, sprinkler and dripping. It is a treatment/disposal system that requires a large amount of land per person.

Design aspects

Population equivalent 
The per person organic matter load is a parameter used in the design of sewage treatment plants. This concept is known as population equivalent (PE). The base value used for PE can vary from one country to another. Commonly used definitions used worldwide are: 1 PE equates to 60 gram of BOD per person per day, and it also equals 200 liters of sewage per day. This concept is also used as a comparison parameter to express the strength of industrial wastewater compared to sewage.

Process selection 
When choosing a suitable sewage treatment process, decision makers need to take into account technical and economical criteria. Therefore, each analysis is site-specific. A life cycle assessment (LCA) can be used, and criteria or weightings are attributed to the various aspects. This makes the final decision subjective to some extent. A range of publications exist to help with technology selection.

In industrialized countries, the most important parameters in process selection are typically efficiency, reliability, and space requirements. In developing countries, they might be different and the focus might be more on construction and operating costs as well as process simplicity.

Choosing the most suitable treatment process is complicated and requires expert inputs, often in the form of feasibility studies. This is because the main important factors to be considered when evaluating and selecting sewage treatment processes are numerous. They include: process applicability, applicable flow, acceptable flow variation, influent characteristics, inhibiting or refractory compounds, climatic aspects, process kinetics and reactor hydraulics, performance, treatment residuals, sludge processing, environmental constraints, requirements for chemical products, energy and other resources; requirements for personnel, operating and maintenance; ancillary processes, reliability, complexity, compatibility, area availability.

With regards to environmental impacts of sewage treatment plants the following aspects are included in the selection process: Odors, vector attraction, sludge transportation, sanitary risks, air contamination, soil and subsoil contamination, surface water pollution or groundwater contamination, devaluation of nearby areas, inconvenience to the nearby population.

Odor control
Odors emitted by sewage treatment are typically an indication of an anaerobic or septic condition. Early stages of processing will tend to produce foul-smelling gases, with hydrogen sulfide being most common in generating complaints. Large process plants in urban areas will often treat the odors with carbon reactors, a contact media with bio-slimes, small doses of chlorine, or circulating fluids to biologically capture and metabolize the noxious gases. Other methods of odor control exist, including addition of iron salts, hydrogen peroxide, calcium nitrate, etc. to manage hydrogen sulfide levels.

Energy requirements 
The energy requirements vary with type of treatment process as well as sewage strength. For example, constructed wetlands and stabilization ponds have low energy requirements. In comparison, the activated sludge process has a high energy consumption because it includes an aeration step. Some sewage treatment plants produce biogas from their sewage sludge treatment process by using a process called anaerobic digestion. This process can produce enough energy to meet most of the energy needs of the sewage treatment plant itself. 

For activated sludge treatment plants in the United States, around 30 percent of the annual operating costs is usually required for energy. Most of this electricity is used for aeration, pumping systems and equipment for the dewatering and drying of sewage sludge. Advanced sewage treatment plants, e.g. for nutrient removal, require more energy than plants that only achieve primary or secondary treatment.

Small rural plants using trickling filters may operate with no net energy requirements, the whole process being driven by gravitational flow, including tipping bucket flow distribution and the desludging of settlement tanks to drying beds. This is usually only practical in hilly terrain and in areas where the treatment plant is relatively remote from housing because of the difficulty in managing odors.

Co-treatment of industrial effluent
In highly regulated developed countries, industrial wastewater usually receives at least pretreatment if not full treatment at the factories themselves to reduce the pollutant load, before discharge to the sewer. The pretreatment has the following two main aims: Firstly, to prevent toxic or inhibitory compounds entering the biological stage of the sewage treatment plant and reduce its efficiency. And secondly to avoid toxic compounds from accumulating in the produced sewage sludge which would reduce its beneficial reuse options. Some industrial wastewater may contain pollutants which cannot be removed by sewage treatment plants. Also, variable flow of industrial waste associated with production cycles may upset the population dynamics of biological treatment units.

Design aspects of secondary treatment processes

Non-sewered areas 
Urban residents in many parts of the world rely on on-site sanitation systems without sewers, such as septic tanks and pit latrines, and fecal sludge management in these cities is an enormous challenge.

For sewage treatment the use of septic tanks and other on-site sewage facilities (OSSF) is widespread in some rural areas, for example serving up to 20 percent of the homes in the U.S.

Available process steps 

Sewage treatment often involves two main stages, called primary and secondary treatment, while advanced treatment also incorporates a tertiary treatment stage with polishing processes. Different types of sewage treatment may utilize some or all of the process steps listed below.

Preliminary treatment
Preliminary treatment (sometimes called pretreatment) removes coarse materials that can be easily collected from the raw sewage before they damage or clog the pumps and sewage lines of primary treatment clarifiers.

Screening 

The influent in sewage water passes through a bar screen to remove all large objects like cans, rags, sticks, plastic packets, etc. carried in the sewage stream. This is most commonly done with an automated mechanically raked bar screen in modern plants serving large populations, while in smaller or less modern plants, a manually cleaned screen may be used. The raking action of a mechanical bar screen is typically paced according to the accumulation on the bar screens and/or flow rate. The solids are collected and later disposed in a landfill, or incinerated. Bar screens or mesh screens of varying sizes may be used to optimize solids removal. If gross solids are not removed, they become entrained in pipes and moving parts of the treatment plant, and can cause substantial damage and inefficiency in the process.

Grit removal

Grit consists of sand, gravel, rocks, and other heavy materials. Preliminary treatment may include a sand or grit removal channel or chamber, where the velocity of the incoming sewage is reduced to allow the settlement of grit. Grit removal is necessary to (1) reduce formation of deposits in primary sedimentation tanks, aeration tanks, anaerobic digesters, pipes, channels, etc. (2) reduce the frequency of tank cleaning caused by excessive accumulation of grit; and (3) protect moving mechanical equipment from abrasion and accompanying abnormal wear. The removal of grit is essential for equipment with closely machined metal surfaces such as comminutors, fine screens, centrifuges, heat exchangers, and high pressure diaphragm pumps. 

Grit chambers come in three types: horizontal grit chambers, aerated grit chambers, and vortex grit chambers. Vortex grit chambers include mechanically induced vortex, hydraulically induced vortex, and multi-tray vortex separators. During periods of high flow deposited grit is resuspended and the quantity of grit reaching the treatment plant increases substantially.

Flow equalization
Equalization basins can be used to achieve flow equalization. This is especially useful for combined sewer systems which produce peak dry-weather flows or peak wet-weather flows that are much higher than the average flows. Such basins can improve the performance of the biological treatment processes and the secondary clarifiers. 

Disadvantages include the basins' capital cost and space requirements. Basins can also provide a place to temporarily hold, dilute and distribute batch discharges of toxic or high-strength wastewater which might otherwise inhibit biological secondary treatment (such was wastewater from portable toilets or fecal sludge that is brought to the sewage treatment plant in vacuum trucks). Flow equalization basins require variable discharge control, typically include provisions for bypass and cleaning, and may also include aerators and odor control.

Fat and grease removal
In some larger plants, fat and grease are removed by passing the sewage through a small tank where skimmers collect the fat floating on the surface. Air blowers in the base of the tank may also be used to help recover the fat as a froth. Many plants, however, use primary clarifiers with mechanical surface skimmers for fat and grease removal.

Primary treatment

Primary treatment is the "removal of a portion of the suspended solids and organic matter from the sewage".It consists of allowing sewage to pass slowly through a basin where heavy solids can settle to the bottom while oil, grease and lighter solids float to the surface and are skimmed off. These basis are called primary sedimentation tanks or primary clarifiers and typically have a hydraulic retention time (HRT) of 1.5 to 2.5 hours. The settled and floating materials are removed and the remaining liquid may be discharged or subjected to secondary treatment. Primary settling tanks are usually equipped with mechanically driven scrapers that continually drive the collected sludge towards a hopper in the base of the tank where it is pumped to sludge treatment facilities.

Sewage treatment plants that are connected to a combined sewer system sometimes have a bypass arrangement after the primary treatment unit. This means that during very heavy rainfall events, the secondary and tertiary treatment systems can be bypassed to protect them from hydraulic overloading, and the mixture of sewage and storm-water receives primary treatment only.

Primary sedimentation tanks remove about 50–70% of the suspended solids, and 25–40% of the biological oxygen demand (BOD).

Secondary treatment

The main processes involved in secondary sewage treatment are designed to remove as much of the solid material as possible. They use biological processes to digest and remove the remaining soluble material, especially the organic fraction. This can be done with either suspended-growth or biofilm processes. The microorganisms that feed on the organic matter present in the sewage grow and multiply, constituting the biological solids, or biomass. These grow and group together in the form of flocs or biofilms and, in some specific processes, as granules. The biological floc or biofilm and remaining fine solids form a sludge which can be settled and separated. After separation, a liquid remains that is almost free of solids, and with a greatly reduced concentration of pollutants.

Secondary treatment can reduce organic matter (measured as biological oxygen demand) from sewage,  using aerobic or anaerobic processes. The organisms involved in these processes are sensitive to the presence of toxic materials, although these are not expected to be present at high concentrations in typical municipal sewage.

Tertiary treatment

Advanced sewage treatment generally involves three main stages, called primary, secondary and tertiary treatment but may also include intermediate stages and final polishing processes. The purpose of tertiary treatment (also called advanced treatment) is to provide a final treatment stage to further improve the effluent quality before it is discharged to the receiving water body or reused. More than one tertiary treatment process may be used at any treatment plant. If disinfection is practiced, it is always the final process. It is also called effluent polishing. Tertiary treatment may include biological nutrient removal (alternatively, this can be classified as secondary treatment), disinfection and removal of micropollutants, such as environmental persistent pharmaceutical pollutants.

Tertiary treatment is sometimes defined as anything more than primary and secondary treatment in order to allow discharge into a highly sensitive or fragile ecosystem such as estuaries, low-flow rivers or coral reefs. Treated water is sometimes disinfected chemically or physically (for example, by lagoons and microfiltration) prior to discharge into a stream, river, bay, lagoon or wetland, or it can be used for the irrigation of a golf course, greenway or park. If it is sufficiently clean, it can also be used for groundwater recharge or agricultural purposes.

Sand filtration removes much of the residual suspended matter. Filtration over activated carbon, also called carbon adsorption, removes residual toxins. Micro filtration or synthetic membranes are used in membrane bioreactors and can also remove pathogens.

Settlement and further biological improvement of treated sewage may be achieved through storage in large human-made ponds or lagoons. These lagoons are highly aerobic, and colonization by native macrophytes, especially reeds, is often encouraged.

Disinfection 
Disinfection of treated sewage aims to kill pathogens (disease-causing microorganisms) prior to disposal. It is increasingly effective after more elements of the foregoing treatment sequence have been completed. The purpose of disinfection in the treatment of sewage is to substantially reduce the number of pathogens in the water to be discharged back into the environment or to be reused. The effectiveness of disinfection depends on the quality of the water being treated (e.g. turbidity, pH, etc.), the type of disinfection being used, the disinfectant dosage (concentration and time), and other environmental variables. Water with high turbidity will be treated less successfully, since solid matter can shield organisms, especially from ultraviolet light or if contact times are low. Generally, short contact times, low doses and high flows all militate against effective disinfection. Common methods of disinfection include ozone, chlorine, ultraviolet light, or sodium hypochlorite. Monochloramine, which is used for drinking water, is not used in the treatment of sewage because of its persistence. 

Chlorination remains the most common form of treated sewage disinfection in many countries due to its low cost and long-term history of effectiveness. One disadvantage is that chlorination of residual organic material can generate chlorinated-organic compounds that may be carcinogenic or harmful to the environment. Residual chlorine or chloramines may also be capable of chlorinating organic material in the natural aquatic environment. Further, because residual chlorine is toxic to aquatic species, the treated effluent must also be chemically dechlorinated, adding to the complexity and cost of treatment.

Ultraviolet (UV) light can be used instead of chlorine, iodine, or other chemicals. Because no chemicals are used, the treated water has no adverse effect on organisms that later consume it, as may be the case with other methods. UV radiation causes damage to the genetic structure of bacteria, viruses, and other pathogens, making them incapable of reproduction. The key disadvantages of UV disinfection are the need for frequent lamp maintenance and replacement and the need for a highly treated effluent to ensure that the target microorganisms are not shielded from the UV radiation (i.e., any solids present in the treated effluent may protect microorganisms from the UV light). In many countries, UV light is becoming the most common means of disinfection because of the concerns about the impacts of chlorine in chlorinating residual organics in the treated sewage and in chlorinating organics in the receiving water. 

As with UV treatment, heat sterilization also does not add chemicals to the water being treated. However, unlike UV, heat can penetrate liquids that are not transparent. Heat disinfection can also penetrate solid materials within wastewater, sterilizing their contents. Thermal effluent decontamination systems provide low resource, low maintenance effluent decontamination once installed.

Ozone is generated by passing oxygen through a high voltage potential resulting in a third oxygen atom becoming attached and forming . Ozone is very unstable and reactive and oxidizes most organic material it comes in contact with, thereby destroying many pathogenic microorganisms. Ozone is considered to be safer than chlorine because, unlike chlorine which has to be stored on site (highly poisonous in the event of an accidental release), ozone is generated on-site as needed from the oxygen in the ambient air. Ozonation also produces fewer disinfection by-products than chlorination. A disadvantage of ozone disinfection is the high cost of the ozone generation equipment and the requirements for special operators. Ozone sewage treatment requires the use of an ozone generator, which decontaminates the water as ozone bubbles percolate through the tank.

Membranes can also be effective disinfectants, because they act as barriers, avoiding the passage of the microorganisms. As a result, the final effluent may be devoid of pathogenic organisms, depending on the type of membrane used. This principle is applied in membrane bioreactors.

Biological nutrient removal 

Sewage may contain high levels of the nutrients nitrogen and phosphorus. Typical values for nutrient loads per person and nutrient concentrations in raw sewage in developing countries have been published as follows: 8 g/person/d for total nitrogen (45 mg/L), 4.5 g/person/d for ammonia-N (25 mg/L) and 1.0 g/person/d for total phosphorus (7 mg/L). The typical ranges for these values are: 6-10 g/person/d for total nitrogen (35–60 mg/L), 3.5-6 g/person/d for ammonia-N (20–35 mg/L) and 0.7-2.5 g/person/d for total phosphorus (4–15 mg/L).

Excessive release to the environment can lead to nutrient pollution, which can manifest itself in eutrophication. This process can lead to algal blooms, a rapid growth, and later decay, in the population of algae. In addition to causing deoxygenation, some algal species produce toxins that contaminate drinking water supplies.

Ammonia nitrogen, in the form of free ammonia (NH3) is toxic to fish. Ammonia nitrogen, when converted to nitrite and further to nitrate in a water body, in the process of nitrification, is associated with the consumption of dissolved oxygen. Nitrite and nitrate may also have public health significance if concentrations are high in drinking water, because of a disease called metahemoglobinemia. 

Phosphorus removal is important as phosphorus is a limiting nutrient for algae growth in many fresh water systems. Therefore, an excess of phosphorus can lead to eutrophication. It is also particularly important for water reuse systems where high phosphorus concentrations may lead to fouling of downstream equipment such as reverse osmosis.

A range of treatment processes are available to remove nitrogen and phosphorus. Biological nutrient removal (BNR) is regarded by some as a type of secondary treatment process, and by others as a tertiary (or advanced) treatment process.

Nitrogen removal

Nitrogen is removed through the biological oxidation of nitrogen from ammonia to nitrate (nitrification), followed by denitrification, the reduction of nitrate to nitrogen gas. Nitrogen gas is released to the atmosphere and thus removed from the water.

Nitrification itself is a two-step aerobic process, each step facilitated by a different type of bacteria. The oxidation of ammonia  (NH4+)  to nitrite (NO2−) is most often facilitated by bacteria such as Nitrosomonas spp. (nitroso refers to the formation of a nitroso functional group). Nitrite oxidation to nitrate (NO3−), though traditionally believed to be facilitated by Nitrobacter spp. (nitro referring the formation of a nitro functional group), is now known to be facilitated in the environment predominantly by Nitrospira spp.

Denitrification requires anoxic conditions to encourage the appropriate biological communities to form. Anoxic conditions refers to a situation where oxygen is absent but nitrate is present. Denitrification is facilitated by a wide diversity of bacteria. The activated sludge process, sand filters, waste stabilization ponds, constructed wetlands and other processes can all be used to reduce nitrogen. Since denitrification is the reduction of nitrate to dinitrogen (molecular nitrogen) gas, an electron donor is needed. This can be, depending on the wastewater, organic matter (from the sewage itself), sulfide, or an added donor like methanol. The sludge in the anoxic tanks (denitrification tanks) must be mixed well (mixture of recirculated mixed liquor, return activated sludge, and raw influent) e.g. by using submersible mixers in order to achieve the desired denitrification.

Over time, different treatment configurations for activated sludge processes have evolved to achieve high levels of nitrogen removal. An initial scheme was called the Ludzack–Ettinger Process. It could not achieve a high level of denitrification. The Modified Ludzak–Ettinger Process (MLE) came later and was an improvement on the original concept. It recycles mixed liquor from the discharge end of the aeration tank to the head of the anoxic tank. This provides nitrate for the facultative bacteria. 

There are other process configurations, such as variations of the Bardenpho process. They might differ in the placement of anoxic tanks, e.g. before and after the aeration tanks.

Phosphorus removal
Source control via alternative detergent formulations has subsequently reduced the largest contribution, but naturally the phosphorus content of urine and feces remained unchanged. 

Phosphorus can be removed biologically in a process called enhanced biological phosphorus removal. In this process, specific bacteria, called polyphosphate-accumulating organisms (PAOs), are selectively enriched and accumulate large quantities of phosphorus within their cells (up to 20 percent of their mass). 

Phosphorus removal can also be achieved by chemical precipitation, usually with salts of iron (e.g. ferric chloride) or aluminum (e.g. alum), or lime. This may lead to a higher sludge production as hydroxides precipitate and the added chemicals can be expensive. Chemical phosphorus removal requires significantly smaller equipment footprint than biological removal, is easier to operate and is often more reliable than biological phosphorus removal. Another method for phosphorus removal is to use granular laterite or zeolite.

Some systems use both biological phosphorus removal and chemical phosphorus removal.  The chemical phosphorus removal in those systems may be used as a backup system, for use when the biological phosphorus removal is not removing enough phosphorus, or may be used continuously.  In either case, using both biological and chemical phosphorus removal has the advantage of not increasing sludge production as much as chemical phosphorus removal on its own, with the disadvantage of the increased initial cost associated with installing two different systems.

Once removed, phosphorus, in the form of a phosphate-rich sewage sludge, may be sent to landfill or used as fertilizer in admixture with other digested sewage sludges. In the latter case, the treated sewage sludge is also sometimes referred to as biosolids. 22% of the world's phosphorus needs could be satisfied by recycling residential wastewater.

Fourth treatment stage 

Micropollutants such as pharmaceuticals, ingredients of household chemicals, chemicals used in small businesses or industries, environmental persistent pharmaceutical pollutants (EPPP) or pesticides may not be eliminated in the commonly used sewage treatment processes (primary, secondary and tertiary treatment) and therefore lead to water pollution. Although concentrations of those substances and their decomposition products are quite low, there is still a chance of harming aquatic organisms. For pharmaceuticals, the following substances have been identified as toxicologically relevant: substances with endocrine disrupting effects, genotoxic substances and substances that enhance the development of bacterial resistances. They mainly belong to the group of EPPP. 

Techniques for elimination of micropollutants via a fourth treatment stage during sewage treatment are implemented in Germany, Switzerland, Sweden and the Netherlands and tests are ongoing in several other countries. Such process steps mainly consist of activated carbon filters that adsorb the micropollutants. The combination of advanced oxidation with ozone followed by granular activated carbon (GAC) has been suggested as a cost-effective treatment combination for pharmaceutical residues. For a full reduction of microplasts the combination of ultrafiltration followed by GAC has been suggested. Also the use of enzymes such as laccase secreted by fungi is under investigation. Microbial biofuel cells are investigated for their property to treat organic matter in sewage.
	 
To reduce pharmaceuticals in water bodies, source control measures are also under investigation, such as innovations in drug development or more responsible handling of drugs. In the US, the National Take Back Initiative is a voluntary program with the general public, encouraging people to return excess or expired drugs, and avoid flushing them to the sewage system.

Sludge treatment and disposal

Environmental impacts

Sewage treatment plants can have significant effects on the biotic status of receiving waters and can cause some water pollution, especially if the treatment process used is only basic. For example, for sewage treatment plants without nutrient removal, eutrophication of receiving water bodies can be a problem.

Reuse

Irrigation 

Increasingly, people use treated or even untreated sewage for irrigation to produce crops. Cities provide lucrative markets for fresh produce, so are attractive to farmers. Because agriculture has to compete for increasingly scarce water resources with industry and municipal users, there is often no alternative for farmers but to use water polluted with sewage directly to water their crops. There can be significant health hazards related to using water loaded with pathogens in this way. The World Health Organization developed guidelines for safe use of wastewater in 2006. They advocate a ‘multiple-barrier’ approach to wastewater use, where farmers are encouraged to adopt various risk-reducing behaviors. These include ceasing irrigation a few days before harvesting to allow pathogens to die off in the sunlight, applying water carefully so it does not contaminate leaves likely to be eaten raw, cleaning vegetables with disinfectant or allowing fecal sludge used in farming to dry before being used as a human manure.

Reclaimed water

Global situation 

Before the 20th century in Europe, sewers usually discharged into a body of water such as a river, lake, or ocean. There was no treatment, so the breakdown of the human waste was left to the ecosystem. This could lead to satisfactory results if the assimilative capacity of the ecosystem is sufficient which is nowadays not often the case due to increasing population density.

Today, the situation in urban areas of industrialized countries is usually that sewers route their contents to a sewage treatment plant rather than directly to a body of water. In many developing countries, however, the bulk of municipal and industrial wastewater is discharged to rivers and the ocean without any treatment or after preliminary treatment or primary treatment only. Doing so can lead to water pollution. Few reliable figures exist on the share of the wastewater collected in sewers that is being treated in the world. A global estimate by UNDP and UN-Habitat in 2010 was that 90% of all wastewater generated is released into the environment untreated. A more recent study in 2021 estimated that globally, about 52% of sewage is treated. However, sewage treatment rates are highly unequal for different countries around the world. For example, while high-income countries treat approximately 74% of their sewage, developing countries treat an average of just 4.2%. As of 2022, without sufficient treatment, more than 80% of all wastewater generated globally is released into the environment. High-income nations treat, on average, 70% of the wastewater they produce, according to UN Water. Only 8% of wastewater produced in low-income nations receives any sort of treatment. 

The Joint Monitoring Programme (JMP) for Water Supply and Sanitation by WHO and UNICEF report in 2021 that 82% of people with sewer connections are connected to sewage treatment plants providing at least secondary treatment.However, this value varies widely between regions. For example in Europe, North America, Northern Africa and Western Asia, a total of 31 countries had universal (>99%) wastewater treatment. However, in Albania, Bermuda, North Macedonia and Serbia "less than 50% of sewered wastewater received secondary or better treatment" and in Algeria, Lebanon and Libya the value was less than 20% of sewered wastewater that was being treated. The report also found that "globally, 594 million people have sewer connections that don’t receive sufficient treatment. Many more are connected to wastewater treatment plants that do not provide effective treatment or comply with effluent requirements.".

Global targets 
Sustainable Development Goal 6 has a Target 6.3 which is formulated as follows: "By 2030, improve water quality by reducing pollution, eliminating dumping and minimizing release of hazardous chemicals and materials, halving the proportion of untreated wastewater and substantially increasing recycling and safe reuse globally." The corresponding Indicator 6.3.1 is the "proportion of wastewater safely treated". It is anticipated that wastewater production would rise by 24% by 2030 and by 51% by 2050. 

Data in 2020 showed that there is still too much uncollected household wastewater: Only 66% of all household wastewater flows were collected at treatment facilities in 2020 (this is determined from data from 128 countries). Based on data from 42 countries in 2015, the report stated that "32 per cent of all wastewater flows generated from point sources received at least some treatment". For sewage that has indeed been collected at centralized sewage treatment plants, about 79% went on to be safely treated in 2020.

History 

The history of sewage treatment had the following developments: It began with land application (sewage farms) in the 1840s in England, followed by chemical treatment and sedimentation of sewage in tanks, then biological treatment the late 19th century, which led to the development of the activated sludge process starting in 1912.

Regulations 
In most countries, sewage collection and treatment are subject to local and national regulations and standards.

By country

Overview

Europe
In the European Union, 0.8% of total energy consumption goes to wastewater treatment facilities. The European Union needs to make extra investments of €90 billion in the water and waste sector to meet its 2030 climate and energy goals.

In October 2021, British Members of Parliament voted to continue allowing untreated sewage from combined sewer overflows to be released into waterways.

Asia

India 
The 'Delhi Jal Board' (DJB) is currently operating on the construction of the largest sewage treatment plant in India. It will be operational by the end of 2022 with an estimated capacity of 564 MLD. It is supposed to solve the existing situation wherein untreated sewage water is being discharged directly into the river ‘Yamuna’.

Japan

Africa

Libya

Americas

United States

See also

 Decentralized wastewater system
 List of largest wastewater treatment plants
 List of water supply and sanitation by country
 Nutrient Recovery and Reuse: producing agricultural nutrients from sewage
 Organisms involved in water purification
 Sanitary engineering
 Waste disposal

References

External links

 Water Environment Federation – Professional association focusing on municipal wastewater treatment

Environmental engineering
Pollution control technologies
Sanitation
Treatment
Sewerage infrastructure
Water pollution